John W. Fichter (January 2, 1935 – February 11, 2014) was a Republican member of the Pennsylvania House of Representatives.

He was a 1952 Norristown High School graduate. He earned a degree from Ursinus College in 1975. He was first elected to represent the 70th legislative district in the Pennsylvania House of Representatives in 1992. He retired prior to the 2006 election.

He died in 2014, aged 79.

References

External links
 official PA House profile (archived)

1935 births
2014 deaths
People from Montgomery County, Pennsylvania
Ursinus College alumni
Republican Party members of the Pennsylvania House of Representatives